A Costa da Morte may refer to:

Costa da Morte, Spain
 A Costa da Morte (album)